Dolophones is a genus of orb-weaver spiders first described by Charles Athanase Walckenaer in 1837.

Species
 it contains seventeen species:
Dolophones bituberculata Lamb, 1911 – Australia (Queensland)
Dolophones clypeata (L. Koch, 1871) – Indonesia (Moluccas), Australia
Dolophones conifera (Keyserling, 1886) – Australia
Dolophones elfordi Dunn & Dunn, 1946 – Australia (Victoria)
Dolophones intricata Rainbow, 1915 – Australia (South Australia)
Dolophones macleayi (Bradley, 1876) – Australia (Queensland)
Dolophones mammeata (Keyserling, 1886) – Australia
Dolophones maxima Hogg, 1900 – Australia (Victoria)
Dolophones nasalis (Butler, 1876) – Australia (Queensland)
Dolophones notacantha (Quoy & Gaimarg, 1824) – Australia (New South Wales)
Dolophones peltata (Keyserling, 1886) – Australia (mainland, Lord Howe Is.)
Dolophones pilosa (Keyserling, 1886) – Australia
Dolophones simpla (Keyserling, 1886) – Australia (New South Wales)
Dolophones testudinea (L. Koch, 1871) – Australia, New Caledonia
Dolophones thomisoides Rainbow, 1915 – Australia (South Australia)
Dolophones tuberculata (Keyserling, 1886) – Australia (New South Wales)
Dolophones turrigera (L. Koch, 1867) – Australia (Queensland, New South Wales)

References

Araneidae
Araneomorphae genera
Spiders of Australia
Spiders of Oceania
Taxa named by Charles Athanase Walckenaer